Cà Mau is a city in southern Vietnam. It is the capital of Cà Mau Province, a province in the Mekong Delta region, in the southernmost part of Vietnam's inland territory (mainland). The city is characterised by its system of transport canals, and most goods are transported there by boats and barges.

The population is approximately 315,270 as of 2018. Cà Mau is accessible by road (360 km south-west of Ho Chi Minh City) via National Route 1 or by air (Cà Mau Airport). The city is administratively subdivided into eight urban phường (ward) and seven rural xã (commune).

Economy
Cà Mau is Vietnam's biggest exporter of shrimp and prawns. In 2005, Cà Mau province alone exported about $500 million of shrimp and prawns. A large petroleum project under construction, the Cà Mau Gas-Power-Fertilizer Complex, is valued at $1.4 billion.  It includes:
 2 thermal power plants with a total capacity of 1500 MW (equipment provided by the German company Siemens)
 A fertilizer plant with production capacity at 800,000 metric tonnes of urea/year, and
 A gas pipeline 18 inches in diameter to extend 298 km offshore and with 27 km onshore piping in gas from the PM3 gas field shared with Malaysia. Two billion cubic metres of gas are piped to feed these plants per year.

The project opened in December 2008.

Tourism

Cà Mau has several attractions that draw domestic and international tourists. These include several wild bird parks, the southernmost point in Vietnam (called Mũi Cà Mau), and a number of pagodas. Near Cà Mau is the U Minh area with its famous mangrove forest and swamp cuisine: fish hot pots, Vietnamese, Chinese, and Khmer cuisines. Cà Mau also has several 1- to 3-star hotel restaurants.

History
During the 1st millennium, the region of the present Cà Mau province was part of the Kingdom of Funan (Vietnamese: Phù Nam), which included Laos, Cambodia, parts of eastern Thailand, and southern Vietnam (Vietnamese: Nam Bộ). This region was later conquered by the kingdom of Chenla (Vietnamese: Chân Lạp) and the Khmer Empire. In 1757, the land belonging to Cà Mau province ("the black land") was ceded by the Khmer king to the Nguyễn lord of Đàng Trong (central Vietnam) with an early settlement of Vietnamese people. During French rule, Cà Mau was only a small town. During the Republic of Vietnam, the area nearby Cà Mau was a stronghold (Vietnamese: Chiến khu cách mạng) for the Việt Cộng, a Hanoi-backed guerrilla group fighting the United States Army and the South Vietnamese government during the Vietnam War. After 1975, Cà Mau was made the administrative seat and the governmental center of Minh Hải Province, which included Cà Mau and Bạc Liêu Province. In 1995, Cà Mau province broke off from Minh Hải Province with Cà Mau as its capital. In 1999, the prime minister by a decree recognised Cà Mau as a borough (Vietnamese: Thị xã) – Cà Mau Borough (3rd class urban area as per Vietnamese law). In 2010, the Prime Minister further upgraded City of Cà Mau to a 2nd class urban area.

Transportation
Cà Mau is served by Cà Mau Airport.

Demographics
The majority of its residents is ethnic Vietnamese, in addition to 300 Khmer Krom households and 400 Hoa households.

Climate
Cà Mau has a tropical monsoon climate with a lengthy wet season and a relatively brief dry season. Temperatures are high year round, but rise noticeably before the arrival of the monsoons in April.

People from Ca Mau
Nguyễn Tấn Dũng - Prime Minister of Vietnam from 2006 to 2016.

Gallery

References

External links

Ground-breaking ceremony of gas-power-fertilizer project

Populated places in Cà Mau province
Populated places on the Mekong River
Districts of Cà Mau province
Provincial capitals in Vietnam
Cities in Vietnam